Asen Georgiev (Bulgarian: Асен Георгиев; born 9 July 1993) is a Bulgarian professional footballer who plays as a defender for Septemvri Sofia.

Career
Georgiev started his career at Levski Sofia. In September 2010, he was named on the bench for Levski in their Europa League game against K.A.A. Gent.

On 4 July 2012, Georgiev joined Botev Vratsa. He made his A Group debut in a 4–0 away loss against Beroe Stara Zagora on 11 August.

On 3 February 2017, Georgiev signed with Beroe Stara Zagora. On 31 July 2017, his contract was terminated by mutual consent.

On 11 August 2017, Georgiev signed a two year contract with Lokomotiv Plovdiv.

Career statistics
As of 29 May 2016

Honours

Club 
Lokomotiv Plovdiv
Bulgarian Cup: 2018–19

References

External links

1993 births
Living people
Footballers from Sofia
Bulgarian footballers
Bulgaria youth international footballers
Bulgaria under-21 international footballers
FC Botev Vratsa players
PFC Lokomotiv Plovdiv players
FC Montana players
NK Istra 1961 players
PFC Beroe Stara Zagora players
FC Hebar Pazardzhik players
FC Septemvri Sofia players
First Professional Football League (Bulgaria) players
Second Professional Football League (Bulgaria) players
Croatian Football League players
Bulgarian expatriate footballers
Expatriate footballers in Croatia
Association football defenders